Guyana competed in the 2015 Pan American Games in Toronto, Ontario, Canada from July 10 to 26, 2015.

Guyana's team consisted of 22 athletes (19 men and three women) competing in five sports. Swimmer Onika George was the flagbearer for the team during the opening ceremony.

Competitors
The following table lists Guyana's delegation per sport and gender.

Athletics

Guyana's track and field team consisted of three athletes (two men and one woman).

Track events

Badminton

Guyana received two quota spots to enter one male and one female.

Rugby sevens

Guyana qualified a men's rugby sevens team, after winning the 2014 NACRA Sevens held in December 2014. The team consisted of twelve athletes.
Men's tournament

Group B

Fifth through Eighth places

Seventh place match

Squash

Guyana qualified a men's squash team of three athletes.

Singles and Doubles 

Team

Swimming

Guyana received two universality spots (one male and one female).

See also
Guyana at the 2016 Summer Olympics

References

Nations at the 2015 Pan American Games
P
2015